Providence is an unincorporated community in Dunklin County, in the U.S. state of Missouri.

Providence was founded ca. 1836, and named after a local Baptist church of the same name.

References

Unincorporated communities in Dunklin County, Missouri
Unincorporated communities in Missouri